TunnelVision Brilliance is the 2006 debut album by Scott Reeder, former bassist of Kyuss. The album was recorded intermittently over an 18 year period, mainly with song ideas that did not quite fit with the bands Reeder was  active with over that time. Reeder performed, recorded and produced the album entirely on his own.

Track listing
"When I Was" - 1:17 
"Thanks" – 2:56 
"The Silver Tree" – 3:06 
"Away" – 1:29 
"Diamond" – 4:42 
"When?" – 2:24 
"For Renee" – 3:25 
"The Day of Neverending" – 4:12 
"Queen of Greed" – 2:40 
"Fuck You All" – 4:11 
"To an End" – 3:17 
"The Fourth" – 3:34 
"As I'm Dreamin'" – 4:28

Personnel
Written, performed, recorded, and mixed by Scott Reeder

References

2006 debut albums
Scott Reeder (bassist) albums